The Jiashen Incident, also known as the Battle of Beijing, took place between February and April 1644 in the areas surrounding Beijing, and was fought between forces of the Ming dynasty and the Shun dynasty. It eventually resulted in the collapse of the Ming dynasty. Remnants of the imperial House of Zhu, whose regime is known as the Southern Ming dynasty in historiography, would continue to rule parts of southern China until 1662.

Li Zicheng led his rebel army to attack the Ming capital Beijing from two directions (north and south). The eunuch official Du Zhizhi (杜之秩) ordered the Ming forces defending Beijing to open the city gates and let Li Zicheng's army in. After the fall of Beijing, the last Ming ruler, the Chongzhen Emperor, committed suicide by hanging himself on a tree near the Forbidden City. No actual battle was fought in Beijing itself as the rebels marched into the capital unopposed, and even after occupying Beijing, the rebels did not face any resistance. Li Zicheng's short-lived Shun dynasty would be subsequently defeated by forces of the Manchu-led Qing dynasty, which would go on to rule China proper until its fall in 1912.

See also 
Juyongguan
Battle of Shanhai Pass
History of Beijing

References 

Battles involving the Ming dynasty
Conflicts in 1644
Military history of Beijing
1644 in China
Shun dynasty